Psychedelic folk (sometimes acid folk or freak folk) is a loosely defined form of psychedelia that originated in the 1960s. It retains the largely acoustic instrumentation of folk, but adds musical elements common to psychedelic music.

Characteristics

Psychedelic folk generally favors acoustic instrumentation although it often incorporates other instrumentation. Chanting, early music and various non-Western folk music influences are often found in psych folk. Much like its rock counterpart, psychedelic folk is often known for a peculiar, trance-like, and atmospheric sound, often drawing on musical improvisation and Asian influences.

History

1960s: Peak years

The first musical use of the term psychedelic is thought to have been by the New York-based folk group  The Holy Modal Rounders on their version of Lead Belly's 'Hesitation Blues' in 1964. 
Folk/avant-garde guitarist John Fahey recorded several songs in the early 1960s that experimented with unusual recording techniques, including backward tapes, and novel instrumental accompaniment.  His nineteen-minute "The Great San Bernardino Birthday Party" "anticipated elements of psychedelia with its nervy improvisations and odd guitar tunings". Other songs from Fahey's The Great San Bernardino Birthday Party & Other Excursions (recorded between 1962 and 1966) also used "unsettling moods and dissonances" that took them beyond the typical folk fare. In 1967, he performed with the psychedelic/avant-garde/noise rock band Red Krayola (then Red Crayola) at the Berkeley Folk Festival which was recorded and later released as Live 1967.  Among other descriptions, their performance has been likened to early Velvet Underground bootlegs and "the very weirdest parts of late-'60s Pink Floyd pieces (like the shrieking guitar scrapes of 'Interstellar Overdrive')".

Similarly, folk guitarist Sandy Bull's early work "incorporated elements of folk, jazz, and Indian and Arabic-influenced dronish modes".  His 1963 album Fantasias for Guitar and Banjo explores various styles and instrumentation and "could also be accurately described as one of the very first psychedelic records".  Later albums, such as 1968's E Pluribus Unum and his live album Still Valentine's Day 1969, which use experimental recording techniques and extended improvisation, also have psychedelic elements.

Musicians with several groups that became identified with psychedelic rock began as folk musicians, such as those with the Grateful Dead, Jefferson Airplane, Country Joe and the Fish, Quicksilver Messenger Service, The Beau Brummels from San Francisco; The Byrds, Love, Kaleidoscope, and The Peanut Butter Conspiracy from Los Angeles; Pearls Before Swine from Florida; and Jake and the Family Jewels, and Cat Mother & the All Night Newsboys from New York. The Serpent Power was a psychedelic rock group with a strong folk influence. The Byrds was the most important american folk rock band to incorporate psychedelia in their sound and themes.

In the UK, folk artists who were particularly significant included Marc Bolan, with his hippy duo Tyrannosaurus Rex, who used unusual instrumentation and tape effects, typified by the album Unicorn (1969), and Scottish performers such as Donovan, who combined influences of American artists like Bob Dylan with references to flower power, and the Incredible String Band, who from 1967 incorporated a range of influences into their acoustic based music, including medieval and eastern instruments. During the late 1960s and early 1970s, solo acts such as Syd Barrett and Nick Drake began to incorporate psychedelic influences into folk music with albums such as Barrett's The Madcap Laughs and Drake's Five Leaves Left.

1970s: Decline
In the mid 1970s psychedelia began to fall out of fashion and those folk groups that had not already moved into different areas had largely disbanded. In Britain folk groups also tended to electrify as did acoustic duo Tyrannosaurus Rex which became the electric combo T. Rex. This was a continuation of a process by which progressive folk had considerable impact on mainstream rock.

1990s–present: Revival

Independent and underground folk artists in the late 1990s led to a revival of psychedelic folk with the New Weird America movement. Also, Animal Collective's early albums identify closely with freak folk as does their collaboration with veteran British folk artist Vashti Bunyan, and The Microphones/Mount Eerie, who combine naturalistic elements with lo-fi and psychedelia. Both artists received significant exposure in the indie music scene following critical acclaim from review site Pitchfork Media and soon more artists began experimenting with the genre, including Quilt, Grizzly Bear, Devendra Banhart, Rodrigo Amarante, Ben Howard and Grouper.

In 2022, Uncut Magazine published a CD called Blackwaterside: Sounds of the New Weird Albion, featuring artists including Jim Ghedi, Henry Parker, Jon Wilks, Sam Lee, and Cath Tyler. This subsequently led to the publication of an extensive exploration of Britain's new "weird folk" in Japanese music magazine, Ele-King. The lead article looked at artists including Nick Hart, Burd Ellen, Elspeth Anne, Frankie Archer, Shovel Dance Collective and Angeline Morrison.

Freak folk

Freak folk is a loosely defined synonym or subgenre of psychedelic folk that involves acoustic sounds, pastoral lyrics, and a neo-hippie aesthetic. The label originated from the "lost treasure" reissue culture of the late 1990s.

Vashti Bunyan has been labeled "the Godmother of Freak Folk" for her role in inspiring the new crop of folk experimentalists. David Crosby's 1971 album If Only I Could Remember My Name has been described as an early progenitor of the genre. Other major influences on later freak folk artists include Linda Perhacs,Anne Briggs, Karen Dalton, Shirley & Dolly Collins, Animal Collective, the Incredible String Band, Xiu Xiu, and Pearls Before Swine. Devendra Banhart would become one of the leaders of the 2000s freak folk movement, along with Joanna Newsom.

List of artists
Psychedelic folk artists

See also
Jam bands
Folk rock
Anti-folk
Freak scene
Neil Young
Folk music
New Weird America
Ptolemaic Terrascope – a psychedelic folk & rock magazine

References

Bibliography

External links
PsychedelicFolk.com, by Gerald Van Waes
Prog Archives: resource for psych folk and all other types of psychedelic music
Ptolemaic Terrascope: resource for psych folk and all other types of psychedelic music
Dream Magazine: resource for psych folk and all other types of psychedelic music
Contemporary Psychedelia: From Transcendence to Immanence – An essay on psych folk and spirituality
Dirty Linen Magazine feature article on New Psych Folk
Freak Folk Flies High by Derek Richardson at SFGate.com
Poecke, N. van. The New Weird Generation
Freak-Folk Genre

 
American styles of music
American rock music genres